Lanhélin is a former commune in the Ille-et-Vilaine department in Brittany in northwestern France. On 1 January 2019, it was merged into the new commune Mesnil-Roc'h.

Population
The inhabitants of Lanhélin are known as Lanhélinois in French.

See also
Communes of the Ille-et-Vilaine department

References

Former communes of Ille-et-Vilaine